The Normandy Museum (Musée de Normandie) is a public museum in Caen, Normandy, France. It has been housed in the Château de Caen since 1963. In June 1970 the Caen Museum of Fine Arts also moved into the castle,
expanding the collection. 

The founding of the museum goes back to Georges Henri Rivière who wanted to set up a national network of regional museums in France in the 1930s. Soon after the second World War had ended, in the summer of 1945, he was assessing the damage caused to public 
collections during the war. While passing through Caen he gazed at the ruined city along with Michel de Boüard, professor of history at the University of Caen and Jean Vergnet-Ruiz, inspector general of provincial museums. The idea of the museum was born as the discussions between these men took place.

Over time, the collection expanded, and now includes ancient as well as Medieval items. The museum now holds more than 80,000 objects. Since 2016, the museum has exhibited the Treasure of Saint-Germain-de-Varreville, discovered in 2011 and the Treasure of Tourouvre.

Ancient items

Sources
 Rémy Desquesnes, Caen 1900-2000 : un siècle de vie, Fécamp, éditions des Falaises, 2001 
 Jean-Yves Marin et Jean-Marie Levesque (dir.), Mémoires du château de Caen, Caen, Skira-Seuil, 2000 
 Georges-Henri Rivière, Musée de Normandie : Ville de Caen, Caen, 1963.

Museums in France